Applied Maths NV, a bioMérieux company headquartered in Sint-Martens-Latem, Belgium, is a bioinformatics company developing software for the biosciences.

History

Applied Maths was founded in 1992 and gained worldwide recognition with the software GelCompar, used as a standard tool for the normalization and comparative analysis of electrophoresis patterns (PFGE, AFLP, RAPD, REP-PCR and variants, etc.).

GelCompar II was released in 1998 to deal with the ever growing amounts of information following the success and expansion of electrophoresis and other fingerprinting techniques in various application fields in microbiology, virology and mycology. Following the introduction of the concepts of polyphasic taxonomy  and the growing need to combine genotypic, phenotypic, electrophoresis and sequence information, Applied Maths released in 1996 the software package BIONUMERICS which still today is a platform for the management, storage and (statistical) analysis of all types of biological data. BIONUMERICS and GelCompar II are used by several networks around the globe, such as PulseNet and CaliciNet, to share and identify strain information.

In January 2016, Applied Maths was acquired by bioMérieux.

Products

BIONUMERICS: BIONUMERICS is a commercial suite of 4 configurations used for the analysis of all major applications in bioinformatics: 1D electrophoresis gels, chromatographic and spectrometric profiles, phenotype characters, microarrays, sequences, etc.

GelCompar II: GelCompar II is a suite of 5 modules developed for the analysis of fingerprint patterns, covering the normalization, import into a relational database and the comparative analysis.

BNServer: BNserver is the web-based platform generally installed between a centrally maintained database and distributed clients using BIONUMERICS, GelCompar II or a web browser to exchange biological information and analysis results. BNServer has been used since the nineties in Food outbreak detection.

Reception

Over 15000 peer-reviewed research articles mention the use of Applied Maths software packages BIONUMERICS or Gelcompar II.

References

External links

Biotechnology companies of Belgium
Computational science
Bioinformatics companies
Software companies established in 1992
Biotechnology companies established in 1992
1992 establishments in Belgium
Software companies of Belgium
Companies based in East Flanders